2BE may refer to:

 2BE Belfast, former radio station in Belfast, Northern Ireland.
 2BE (TV channel), a commercial TV channel in Flanders
 2BE (AM), the former call sign of radio station 2EC in Bega, New South Wales, Australia
 2BE (Sydney), Australia's first B Class or commercial radio station

See also
 BE (disambiguation)
 BBE (disambiguation)
 Bebe (disambiguation)